is a Japanese manga artist. In 1984, he won the Kodansha Manga Award for shōnen for Bats & Terry.

He is the father of manga artist Towa Oshima.

Selected works
 Kenkaku Shōbai (2008–2021)

References

External links 
  
 

Manga artists from Kyoto Prefecture
Winner of Kodansha Manga Award (Shōnen)
Living people
Year of birth missing (living people)